Selaginella kraussiana 'Gold Tips' is a cultivar of Selaginella kraussiana. It is similar to the cultivar Aurea but with gold tips.

References

kraussiana
Ornamental plant cultivars